Benjamin Joseph Sheppard (23 June 1890 – 9 September 1931) was an Australian sportsman who played first-class cricket for Victoria and Australian rules football with Melbourne and Richmond in the Victorian Football League (VFL).

Sheppard started out as a footballer at Xavier College before being recruited by Melbourne. He played four senior games with Melbourne in the 1911 VFL season and one for Richmond in 1912.

In 1914 he appeared in two first-class cricket matches for Victoria during a tour of Tasmania. A wicket-keeper, his highest score was 30, which he made at Launceston.

See also
 List of Victoria first-class cricketers

References

External links

Cricinfo: Benjamin Sheppard

1890 births
1931 deaths
People from Fitzroy, Victoria
Melbourne Football Club players
Richmond Football Club players
Australian cricketers
Victoria cricketers
People educated at Xavier College
Cricketers from Melbourne
Australian rules footballers from Melbourne
Wicket-keepers